The Chinese Super League Cup was a football tournament in China held for two years from 2004 until 2005.

History
Chinese Super League Cup was established in the inaugural season of the Chinese Super League (CSL) as a supplementary tournament while 12 inaugural CSL clubs lacked of matches. It was abolished in 2006 after CSL expanded to 15 clubs. The Chinese Football Association planned to reorganize the League Cup in 2013; however, the plan was rejected by most of the CSL clubs.

Results
2004: Shandong Luneng 2:0 Shenzhen Jianlibao
2005: Wuhan Huanghelou 3:1 (total score) Shenzhen Jianlibao

References

Football competitions in China
National association football league cups
Recurring sporting events established in 2004
2004 establishments in China
Recurring sporting events disestablished in 2005
2005 disestablishments in China